Psych 2: Lassie Come Home is a 2020 American made-for-television comedy film based on the USA Network dramedy series Psych. The film is a stand-alone sequel to the first film from 2017. The movie was released on July 15, 2020 on Peacock. James Roday Rodriguez, Dulé Hill, Timothy Omundson, Maggie Lawson, Kirsten Nelson, and Corbin Bernsen all reprised their roles from the series and first film, with frequently recurring actors Kurt Fuller and Jimmi Simpson also appearing. The film was directed by series creator Steve Franks, who co-wrote the script with Roday Rodriguez and Berman.

Plot
Chief Carlton Lassiter of the Santa Barbara Police Department is ambushed on the job and left for dead. After suffering a stroke on the operating table, Lassiter starts seeing unusual and possibly supernatural occurrences in his recovery clinic. Concerned that his condition makes him an unreliable witness to the truth of what he saw, he reaches out to Shawn and Gus. The pair travel to Santa Barbara from San Francisco to assist Lassiter in his efforts to find his shooter and explain what he has been seeing. However, they are told that hallucinations are side-effects of the medicine. What they do not realize is that Juliet O'Hara, Lassiter's former partner at the SBPD and Shawn's wife, is also investigating. Chief Vick is attempting to become commissioner and is forced to shut down Juliet's investigation.

Morrisey, Lassiter's dog, returns from a walk with a human hand which Shawn and Gus send to Woody, a coroner. Juliet discovers the missing bullet, and sends it to be analysed against orders. Juliet and Shawn attempt to hide their own involvement from each other. Woody's results reveal the hand belongs to a CEO who committed suicide and Shawn and Gus return to Santa Barbara. Lassiter witnesses a bleeding man seek shelter in a building across from his own, but it is mixed up with other hallucinations causing everyone to disbelieve his claims. Shawn and Gus investigate, but only find medical supplies and ice chips before being forced to leave by Dr Emile Herschel. Selene, Gus's girlfriend, tells Juliet that the two have secretly gone back to Santa Barbara. The two start their own investigation together. Chief Vick discovers this, but covers it up whilst preparing for interviews. 

Shawn and Gus investigate a Viking's Bar and after being chased out crash into a hideout where the supposedly dead CEO is hiding. The CEO is sniped and killed and Buzz, now an SBPD detective, investigates. Juliet and Selene arrive and Shawn finds a positive pregnancy test in her car. Attempting to prove that the CEO's silent partner, Wilkerson, who is in Lassiter's hospital, is faking a coma, Gus and Shawn try to tickle him but it fails and they're kicked out. Woody pretends to be an eccentric doctor named Catalon for them. During her commissioner interview, Vick has an epiphany and leaves. Woody, Shawn and Gus find bloodied clothes hidden among the medical supplies and them alongside Shawn's father Henry, attempt to convince Dolores - a nurse with a crush on Gus - that Herschel is guilty.

After Shawn and Gus both have vivid hallucinations they realise that the ice chips are spiked and come across an awake Wilkerson who tells them that he is being blackmailed by a doctor after the ice chips caused him to tell them everything. The two go back to the bar with Woody where the find Selene, Juliet and Vick already there. They discover the son of the owner murdered his father and Selene reveals she is pregnant, proposes to Gus and punches the killer. Meanwhile, Dolores spikes Lassiter's drugs, but after he shoots the bag tries to inject with poison. Lassiter is encouraged by hallucinations to stand up after previously being unable and he manages to subdue her.

After it is all over, Lassiter manages to take his first steps to see his wife again and Woody is forced to flee the hospital after the real Catalon arrives.

Cast

Production
After Psych: The Movie, Franks indicated he wanted to make five more Psych movies. On February 14, 2019, it was announced Psych: The Movie 2 was greenlit and all the main cast would return for the TV movie, which was set to premiere in late 2019. On April 18, 2019, it was announced Joel McHale would be joining the TV movie, as well as Jimmi Simpson, reprising his recurring role as Mary Lightly. On September 17, 2019, it was announced that the sequel had been renamed Psych 2: Lassie Come Home and would instead be airing on NBC Universal's new streaming service, Peacock.

Reception
The site's critical consensus reads, "Satisfyingly self-contained while refreshingly opening up new directions for the Psych team, Lassie Come Home delivers the crowd-pleasing goods with the skill of a mind reader." TV Guide graded the film five out of five stars.

Sequel

On May 13, 2021, Peacock announced a third movie, Psych 3: This Is Gus, which premiered November 18, 2021 on the streaming service Peacock.

References

External links
 

Psych episodes
American comedy-drama films
American detective films
American sequel films
2020s English-language films
2020 films
2020 comedy-drama films
Peacock (streaming service) original films
Films set in Santa Barbara, California
Television films based on television series
Television sequel films
Films directed by Steve Franks
2020s American films